Cadeau Kelley (born 9 May 1986) is a retired Liberian long jumper.

He finished sixth at the 2006 African Championships. He also competed at the 2007 All-Africa Games without reaching the final.

His personal best jump is 8.00 metres, achieved April 2009 in Ypsilanti. This is the Liberian record.

References

1986 births
Living people
Liberian male long jumpers
Place of birth missing (living people)
Athletes (track and field) at the 2007 All-Africa Games
African Games competitors for Liberia